was a Japanese politician who served in the House of Representatives from 1969 to 1976 and from 1979 to 2000, as Secretary-General of the Liberal Democratic Party from 1992 to 1993, and as Chief Cabinet Secretary from 1996 to 1998.

Early life 

Kajiyama studied at the Imperial Japanese Army Air Academy from 1944 to 1945. After the end of World War II disbanded the Academy, he entered Nihon University, from which he graduated in 1947. He then took over his family's business in Ibaraki Prefecture for several years.

Political career 
After a stint in the Ibaraki Prefectural Assembly from 1955 to 1969, Kajiyama was elected to the House of Representatives in the 1969 general election, the first of nine electoral victories.

Kajiyama generated controversy in 1990 when, after an arrest of prostitutes in Shinjuku, in which he was involved in a racist incident by calling blacks "Prostitutes" when talking about the shinjuku neighborhood saying that "Here it happens like in the neighborhoods of United States, that the arrival of the blacks forces the whites to leave". , which again generated protests and caused the United States Department of State to pronounce itself condemning such words and describing them as "extremely racist" and that any type of prejudice against an ethnic group is highly reprehensible and that these words were very offensive to the American people for which he apologized in the days that followed. who apologized in the following days."

Kajiyama became a prominent supporter of faction leader Noboru Takeshita. He served as Minister of Home Affairs under the Takeshita cabinet from 1987 to 1989, as Minister of International Trade and Industry under the Uno cabinet from 1989 to 1990, as Minister of Justice under the Kaifu cabinet from 1990 to 1992. He then served as Secretary-General of the LDP from 1992 to 1993, resigning in the wake of the unsuccessful 1993 general election.

In a political comeback, he was appointed Chief Cabinet Secretary under Prime Minister Ryutaro Hashimoto from January 1996 to July 1998, and thereafter unsuccessfully challenged Keizo Obuchi for the presidency of the LDP. In the midst of a financial crisis, Kajiyama  advocated allowing large banks to fail through a "hard landing" policy, rather than providing government support to keep them afloat. Kajiyama's supporters in his "rebellion" included Yoshihide Suga, who would later serve as Chief Cabinet Secretary under Prime Minister Shinzo Abe in the 2010s.

Death and legacy
Kajiyama was involved in a traffic accident in January 2000, and retired from politics in April of that year. He later underwent treatment for clogged arteries, and died at a Tokyo hospital in June of that year. He was survived by his wife and two children. One of his sons, Hiroshi Kajiyama, took over his Diet seat and later became a Cabinet minister.

References 

Liberal Democratic Party (Japan) politicians
1926 births
2000 deaths
Government ministers of Japan
Ministers of Justice of Japan
Ministers of Home Affairs of Japan